Serbia participated in the Eurovision Song Contest 2019 with the song "" written and performed by Nevena Božović who had previously represented Serbia in the Junior Eurovision Song Contest in 2007 and in the Eurovision Song Contest in 2013 as part of the group . The Serbian national broadcaster, Radio Television of Serbia (RTS) organised the national final  2019 in order to select the Serbian entry for the 2019 contest in Tel Aviv, Israel. The national final consisted of three shows: two semi-finals on 27 and 28 February 2019 and a final on 3 March 2019. Twelve entries competed in each semi-final where the top six qualified to the final from each semi-final following the combination of votes from a five-member jury panel and a public televote. The twelve qualifiers competed in the final which resulted in "" performed by Nevena Božović as the winner following the combination of votes from a five-member jury panel and a public televote.

Serbia was drawn to compete in the first semi-final of the Eurovision Song Contest which took place on 14 May 2019. Performing during the show in position 9, "Kruna" was announced among the top 10 entries of the first semi-final and therefore qualified to compete in the final on 18 May. It was later revealed that Serbia placed seventh out of the 17 participating countries in the semi-final with 156 points. In the final, Serbia performed in position 23 and placed eighteenth out of the 26 participating countries, scoring 89 points.

Background 

Prior to the 2019 contest, Serbia had participated in the Eurovision Song Contest eleven times since its first entry in 2007, winning the contest with their debut entry "" performed by Marija Šerifović. Since 2007, eight out of eleven of Serbia's entries have featured in the final with the nation failing to qualify in 2009, 2013 and 2017. Serbia's 2018 entry "Nova deca" performed by Sanja Ilić and Balkanika qualified to the final and placed nineteenth.

The Serbian national broadcaster, Radio Television of Serbia (RTS), broadcasts the event within Serbia and organises the selection process for the nation's entry. RTS confirmed their intentions to participate at the 2019 Eurovision Song Contest on 6 August 2018. Between 2007 and 2009, Serbia used the  national final in order to select their entry. However, after their 2009 entry, "" performed by Marko Kon and Milaan, failed to qualify Serbia to the final, the broadcaster shifted their selection strategy to selecting specific composers to create songs for artists. In 2010, RTS selected Goran Bregović to compose songs for a national final featuring three artists, while in 2011 Kornelije Kovač, Aleksandra Kovač and Kristina Kovač were tasked with composing one song each. In 2012, the internal selection of Željko Joksimović and the song "" secured the country's second highest placing in the contest to this point, placing third. In 2013, RTS returned to an open national final format and organized the Beosong competition. The winning entry, "" performed by Moje 3, failed to qualify Serbia to the final at the 2013 Eurovision Song Contest. In 2015, RTS selected Vladimir Graić, the composer of Serbia's 2007 Eurovision Song Contest winning entry "", to compose songs for a national final featuring three artists. RTS internally selected the Serbian entries in 2016 and 2017 with the decision made by RTS music editors. In 2018, RTS returned to using the  national final in order to select their entry.

Before Eurovision

Beovizija 2019
 2019 was the ninth edition of the  national final organised by RTS in order to select the Serbian entry for the Eurovision Song Contest 2019. The selection consisted of two semi-finals featuring twelve songs each to be held on 27 and 28 February 2019, respectively, and a final featuring twelve songs to be held on 3 March 2019.

Competing entries 
Artists and songwriters were able to submit their entries between 8 August 2018 and 15 November 2018. Artists were required to be Serb citizens and submit entries in one of the official languages of the Republic of Serbia, while songwriters of any nationality were allowed to submit songs. At the closing of the deadline, 76 submissions were received. A selection committee consisting of RTS music editors reviewed the submissions and selected twenty-four entries to proceed to the national final. The selected competing entries were announced on 10 January 2019 and among the competing artists were Extra Nena, who represented Yugoslavia in the Eurovision Song Contest 1992, and Nevena Božović who represented Serbia in the Junior Eurovision Song Contest 2007 and 2013, the latter as part of the group Moje 3.

Semi-finals
Two semi-finals took place at the Studio 8 of RTS in Košutnjak, Belgrade on 27 and 28 February 2019. In each semi-final twelve songs competed and six qualifiers for the final were decided by a combination of votes from a jury panel consisting of Zoran Lesendrić (musician), Dragomir Stanojević (musician), Nenad Pribak (president of OGAE Serbia), Aleksandar Aleksov (composer and producer) and Ivana Peters (singer-songwriter), and the Serbian public via SMS voting.

In addition to the competing entries, other performers and former Eurovision contestants featured during the shows. Knez, who represented Montenegro in 2015, Bojana Stamenov, who represented Serbia in 2015, Sanja Vučić, who represented Serbia in 2016, and Jacques Houdek, who represented Croatia in 2017, featured as guest performers in semi-final 1; and Emilija Kokić, who won the contest for Yugoslavia in 1989 as member of the band Riva, Laka and Mirela, who represented Bosnia and Herzegovina in 2008, Jelena Tomašević, who represented Serbia in 2008, Kaliopi, who represented Macedonia in 2012 and 2016, Lea Sirk, who represented Slovenia in 2018, and Sanja Ilić and Balkanika, which represented Serbia in 2018, featured as guest performers in semi-final 2.

Final
The winner, "" performed by Nevena Božović, was decided by a combination of votes from a jury panel consisting of Miša Aleksić (musician), Bojana Stamenov (represented Serbia in the Eurovision Song Contest 2015), Dejan Ivanović (lyricist), Goca Tržan (singer) and Aleksandar Milić Mili (composer and producer), and the Serbian public via SMS voting. Former Eurovision contestant Željko Joksimović, who represented Serbia and Montenegro in 2004 and Serbia in 2012, was featured as a guest performer during the show.

At Eurovision 
According to Eurovision rules, all nations with the exceptions of the host country and the "Big Five" (France, Germany, Italy, Spain and the United Kingdom) are required to qualify from one of two semi-finals in order to compete for the final; the top ten countries from each semi-final progress to the final. The European Broadcasting Union (EBU) split up the competing countries into six different pots based on voting patterns from previous contests, with countries with favourable voting histories put into the same pot. On 28 January 2019, a special allocation draw was held which placed each country into one of the two semi-finals, as well as which half of the show they would perform in. Serbia was placed into the first semi-final, to be held on 14 May 2019, and was scheduled to perform in the first half of the show.

Once all the competing songs for the 2019 contest had been released, the running order for the semi-finals was decided by the shows' producers rather than through another draw, so that similar songs were not placed next to each other. Serbia was set to perform in position 9, following the entry from Belarus and before the entry from Belgium.

The final was also broadcast via radio on Radio Belgrade 1 with commentary by Nikoleta Dojčinović and Katarina Epštajn. The Serbian spokesperson, who announced the top 12-point score awarded by the Serbian jury during the final, was Dragana Kosjerina.

Semi-final
Nevena Božović took part in technical rehearsals on 4 and 9 May, followed by dress rehearsals on 13 and 14 May. This included the jury show on 13 May where the professional juries of each country watched and voted on the competing entries.

The Serbian performance featured Nevena Božović performing in a black dress and silver accessories which included a necklace, wristband and upper armband. The stage lighting and background LED screens predominately displayed silver colours in the shape of a broken glass which transitioned to yellow and orange colours in the shape of a floating galaxy as the broken glass shatter throughout the song. The performance also featured smoke effects. Nevena Božović was joined by four off-stage backing vocalists: Ivana Vladović, Olga Popović, Dušan Alagić and Mladen Lukić. Lukić had previously represented Serbia in the Eurovision Song Contest 2018 as part of the group Balkanika.

At the end of the show, Serbia was announced as having finished in the top 10 and subsequently qualifying for the grand final. It was later revealed that Serbia placed seventh in the semi-final, receiving a total of 156 points: 65 points from the televoting and 91 points from the juries.

Final 
Shortly after the first semi-final, a winners' press conference was held for the ten qualifying countries. As part of this press conference, the qualifying artists took part in a draw to determine which half of the grand final they would subsequently participate in. This draw was done in the order the countries were announced during the semi-final. Serbia was drawn to compete in the second half. Following this draw, the shows' producers decided upon the running order of the final, as they had done for the semi-finals. Serbia was subsequently placed to perform in position 24, following the entry from Italy and before the entry from Switzerland.

Nevena Božović once again took part in dress rehearsals on 17 and 18 May before the final, including the jury final where the professional juries cast their final votes before the live show. Nevena Božović performed a repeat of her semi-final performance during the final on 18 May. Serbia placed eighteenth in the final, scoring 89 points: 54 points from the televoting and 35 points from the juries.

Voting
Voting during the three shows involved each country awarding two sets of points from 1-8, 10 and 12: one from their professional jury and the other from televoting. Each nation's jury consisted of five music industry professionals who are citizens of the country they represent, with their names published before the contest to ensure transparency. This jury judged each entry based on: vocal capacity; the stage performance; the song's composition and originality; and the overall impression by the act. In addition, no member of a national jury was permitted to be related in any way to any of the competing acts in such a way that they cannot vote impartially and independently. The individual rankings of each jury member as well as the nation's televoting results were released shortly after the grand final.

Below is a breakdown of points awarded to Serbia and awarded by Serbia in the first semi-final and grand final of the contest, and the breakdown of the jury voting and televoting conducted during the two shows:

Points awarded to Serbia

Points awarded by Serbia

Detailed voting results
The following members comprised the Serbian jury:
 Sanja Ilić (jury chairperson)composer, represented Serbia in the 2018 contest with Balkanika
 Aleksandra Milutinovićcomposer
 Leontina Vukomanovićsinger, composer
 Silvana Grujićeditor of music programme RTS
 Vojislav Aralica (Voja)music producer

References

External links
 

2019
Countries in the Eurovision Song Contest 2019
Eurovision